Shadaab Hashmi is an Indian singer-songwriter duo of Shadaab Hashmi, who compose for Hindi films in the Indian film industry.

Career
The duo rose to prominence when they were composing the score for the film Jeena Hai Toh Thok Daal (2012) which includes the hit song "Palang Tod".

Other acts

Shadaab Hashmi is an acclaimed singer in the Bengali Film Music Industry with hits like "Party Shoes", "Bekheyali Mone" and single "Bajlo Pujor Dhaak". Shadaab also lends his voice for a Spotify Original Podcast called Bhaskar Bose. He plays the character Inspector Bikesh Das. 

Abhik has been involved in various indie projects. Other artist names : #abhikism.

Discography

Composer
 CopyCat - The Film (2014)
 Ishq Kills (2014)
 "Mere Saath -- The Buddy Project by Channel V"
 ICICI Prudential (Radio Jingle) (2013)
 By The Way - Season 1 (2013)
 Jeena Hai Toh Thok Daal (2012)
 "Suvreen Guggal – Topper of The Year" (2012–2012)
 "Best friends Forever?" (2012–2013)
 Gurpal SIngh and Preet Kaur (2012)
 World Series Hockey, Mumbai Marines Theme (2012)
 Girl in Bombay, That (2012)
 Muskan (Documentary) (2011)

Musical medley 
 Dil Dosti Dance for Channel V (2012)

Lyricist 
 Jeena Hai Toh Thok Daal (2012)

Shadaab Hashmi as Singer 
 CopyCat (2012)
 "Ye Ishq Hai" Ishq Kills (2014)
 Jeena Hai Toh Thok Daal (2012)
 Mere Saath - The Buddy Project by Channel V (2013) by Saberi Bhattacharya & Shadaab Hashmi
 "Pakka Ghughu Maal" - Ami Shudhu Cheyechi Tomay (2014) (Bengali)
 "Shobi Maya" - Golpo Holeo Shotti (2014) (Bengali)
 "Party Shoes" with Neha Kakkar - Bindaas (2014) (Bengali)
 "Bekheyali Mone" - Romeo vs Juliet (2015) (Bengali)
 "Brishti Bheja" - Aashiqui (2015) (Bengali)
 Baajlo Pujor Dhaak - Baajlo Pujor Dhaak (2016) (Bengali)
 "O riya", "Ae poth jodi na" - Hero 420 (2016) (Bengali)
 "Piya Tore Bina" - Badsha – The Don (2016) (Bengali)
 "Dujone" (Romantic Track) - Samraat: The King Is Here (2016) (Bengali)
 "Obhimani Mone" - Prem Ki Bujhini (2016) (Bengali)
 "Er Kom Jabo Na" - Single - (2016) ft #abhikism
 "Sholoana" - Nabab (2017) (Bengali)
 "Friend Beautiful" - Bizli (2018) (Bengali)
 "Chalbaaz (Title Song)" - Chalbaaz (2018) (Bengali)

Abhik Chatterjee as Singer 

 CopyCat (2012)
 "Ye Ishq Hai" Ishq Kills (2014)
 "Yada Yada" (Gurpal Singh & Preet Kaur) - (2012)
 "Dukkhobilaashita" - Single - (2014) 
 "Chena" - Cover/Single - (2015) ft Rishi Chanda
 "Kakeder Gan" - Dakbaksho - (2016)
 "Sathiya" - Sathiya - (2016) ft Rishi Chanda
 "Daakbaksher Gaan" - Adaptation of Suzanne_(Leonard_Cohen_song)/Single - (2016)
 "Er Kom Jabo Na" - Single - (2016) ft Shadaab Hashmi
 "Shape of You" - Cover/Single - (2018) ft ShaanBro, Astitva & Tanu Saxena
 "Ami Raja" - Single - (2018) ft Diptarka Bose

References

Filmi singers
Indian musical duos
Indian musical groups
Bollywood playback singers
Musical groups established in 2011
2011 establishments in Maharashtra